Bayan, Azerbaijan may refer to:
Bayan, Dashkasan, Azerbaijan
Bayan, Oghuz, Azerbaijan